The Junkers D.I (factory designation J 9) was a monoplane fighter aircraft produced in Germany late in World War I, significant for becoming the first all-metal fighter to enter service. The prototype, a private venture by Junkers named the J 7, first flew on 17 September 1917, going through nearly a half-dozen detail changes in its design during its tests. When it was demonstrated to the Idflieg early the following year it proved impressive enough to result in an order for three additional aircraft for trials. The changes made by Junkers were significant enough for the firm to rename the next example the J 9, which was supplied to the Idflieg instead of the three J 7s ordered.

During tests, the J 9 lacked the manoeuvrability necessary for a front-line fighter but was judged fit for a naval fighter and a batch of 12 was ordered. These were supplied to a naval unit by September 1918, which then moved to the Eastern Front after the Armistice.

Variants
J 7 company designation for early prototype variants, one built (three completed as J 9s).
J 9  company designation for late prototypes and production models
J 9/II  company designation for lengthened fuselage version
D.I  Idflieg designation

Survivors
One example survives and is on display in the Musée de l'Air et de l'Espace, at the Paris–Le Bourget Airport, 11km north of Paris, France. Several replicas have been built, including one on display at the Luftwaffenmuseum Berlin-Gatow.

Specifications

See also

References

Citations

Bibliography

External links

 Fokker D.VII, Halberstadt CL.IV and Junkers D.I
 Junkers D.I at Musée de l'Air et de l'Espace, Le Bourget

1910s German fighter aircraft
D.I
Single-engined tractor aircraft
Aircraft first flown in 1917